Made in Twenty (20) is the fifth Japanese studio album (tenth overall) by South Korean singer BoA. It was released on January 17, 2007, by Avex Trax. The title of the album refers to the fact that this is her first album since leaving her teenage years and her first album made in her 20s - specifically, when she was twenty years old. The album debuted with first-week sales of 182,009 copies, debuting at #1.

Commercial performance 
Made in Twenty (20) debuted at the top of the Oricon Daily Album Charts and held the position for all seven days of the week, until debuting at number one at the Oricon Weekly Album Charts. However, its first-week sales were then the lowest in BoA's career in Japan, as the album sold 182,009 copies in its debut week (its successor The Face sold fewer copies in its debut week). Despite its low sales if comparing with previous efforts, Made in Twenty (20) did more than enough to top the chart, outselling the number two spot (which was also held by another new entry that week) for 138,034 copies.

Track listing

CD only
 "Lady Galaxy"
 "七色の明日 Brand New Beat (Nanairo no Ashita: Brand New Beat) (A Tomorrow of Seven Colors ~brand new beat~)"
 "Winter Love"
 "Still"
 "So Real"
 "Key of Heart"
 "Our Love: To My Parents"
 "No More Make Me Sick"
 "Revolution-code:1986-1105" feat.RAH-D
 "Your Color"
 "Prayer"
 "Candle Lights"
 "Gracious Days"
 "Last Christmas" (Bonus Track)
 "Winter Love" (Live ver.) *

* Bonus track only available on 1st press CD version.

DVD
PVs
 Nanaira no ashita: Brand New Beat PV
 Key of Heart PV
 Winter Love PV

BoA The Live
 Listen to My Heart
 Valenti
 soundscape
 Ain't No Sunshine
 Make a Secret
 Moon & Sunrise
 Winter Love
 Merikuri
 Nanairo no ashita: Brand New Beat~※
 Everlasting※
※：Bonus track for 1st press only

Charts

Weekly charts

Monthly charts

Year-end charts

Sales and certifications

Singles

References

External links 
 Official record label website
  BoA SM official website 
 BoA Avex official website 
 BoA Avex official website 

2007 albums
BoA albums
Avex Group albums